True Blue is a 1918 American silent Western film directed by Frank Lloyd and starring William Farnum, Kathryn Adams and Charles Clary.

Cast

References

Bibliography
 Solomon, Aubrey. The Fox Film Corporation, 1915-1935: A History and Filmography. McFarland, 2011.

External links
 

1918 films
1918 Western (genre) films
Films directed by Frank Lloyd
1910s English-language films
Fox Film films
American black-and-white films
Silent American Western (genre) films
1910s American films